Nogometni klub Osijek, commonly referred to as NK Osijek or simply Osijek, is a Croatian professional football club from Osijek. Founded in 1947, it was the club from Slavonia with the most seasons in the Yugoslav First League and, after the independence of Croatia in 1992, it is one of the four clubs that have never been relegated from the Croatian First League, the others being Dinamo Zagreb, Hajduk Split and Rijeka.

History

1947–1976
The precursor to NK Osijek was founded on 27 February 1945 as NK Udarnik on the tradition of banned JŠK Slavija Osijek, which was founded in 1916 and played in the first jugoslav league 7 times between 1923 and 1941. Already in 1946, the club is merged with Jedinstvo, and changes its name to NK Slavonija. The conventional birthday of the club is considered to be the following year on the February 27, 1947, when NK Slavonija and Nk Bratstvo merge to form the FK Proleter. The first match played under that name comes the 16th of March of that same year, when Proleter beats city-rivals Mladost by five goals to nil. The first competition in which the club participated in was the Osječko Okružno Prvenstvo, along with four other teams. The club got into the second national league soon after. Proleter achieved placement into the Yugoslav First League in 1953, having won the so-called Croato-Slovenian League. The best players from that side were Andrija Vekić, Franjo Rupnik, Dionizije Dvornić and Franjo Majer. Proleter played in the First League for three seasons, but were then relegated to the second division.

Proleter moved to current Gradski vrt stadium in autumn 1958 and changed its name to Slavonija as part of the unifying process of the boxing, athletics and Olympic lifting club in a newly founded sports association in 1962. It still plays in the second league. Five years later the association is disbanded and the club took on the name NK Osijek. The then-colours red and blue were switched to current colours blue and white.

In 1970, Osijek wins the 2nd North League championship, however, Borac Banja Luka beat them in the promotion play-offs. A year later, Bijelo-plavi try for promotion again, winning in a penalty shoot-out against Rijeka, but end up being stopped by Vardar.

The next time Osijek reached the promotion play-offs was in 1973. NK Osijek made it to the final round, beating FC Prishtina. Following their victory, NK Osijek was set to meet NK Zagreb at Stadion Maksimir in Zagreb. A record-breaking 64,129 tickets were sold with approximately 20,000 of them going to Osijek supporters. NK Zagreb proved victorious on the day, winning via a penalty shoot-out following a 2–2 draw after 90 minutes, Osijek denied promotion for a third time in four years.

1977–1991
In 1977, NK Osijek finally secured its return to the top flight by taking out the league championship.

NK Osijek managed to stay competitive in the Yugoslav League up until the Croatian War of Independence, except for the season of 1979–80, when Osijek fought back into the premier league after failing to stay in it. The club was present in the second part of the First League ladder in the 80s, except for 1984, when the team placed 6th, headed by Davidović, Lulić, Džeko, Lepinjica, Rakela, Karačić and the team captain Kalinić. In 1989, the team placed 8th with Davor Šuker leading the line for the side scoring 18 goals, taking out the league's best goalscorer award. Šuker is the only player in NK Osijek history to take out the award. During the last season of the YFL, NK Osijek finished ninth.

1992–1999
After the dissolution of SFR Yugoslavia, the Croatian First Football League was formed and the first season was played in 1992. Due to the war, it was a shortened season played from February to June. NK Osijek was unable to play in Osijek due to the war, so they had to play in the cities of Đakovo, Donji Miholjac and Kutjevo. Osijek finished the 1992 Croatian First League season in 3rd placed, six points behind NK Zagreb and nine behind league champions Hajduk Split. Osijek's top goalscorer was Robert Špehar, who finished the season with nine goals.

NK Osijek quickly became one of the top 4 Croatian football teams. One of Osijek's best ever seasons came in the 1994–95. The Bijelo plavi finished in third place, only six points behind first-placed Hajduk. Špehar scored 23 goals to become the league's top goalscorer. The greats of NK Osijek during that time were–a part from Špehar–Žitnjak, Lulić, Beljan, Ergović, Rupnik, Beširević, Bičanić and Labak.

As a result of the third-placed finish, NK Osijek qualified for the 1995–96 UEFA Cup. Osijek faced Slovan Bratislava in the preliminary round, going down 6–0.

Osijek finished third in the 1997–98 Croatian First League, qualifying for the 1998–99 UEFA Cup. Osijek came up against Anderlecht. After a famous 3–1 victory at home in front of 15,000 supporters, Osijek lost 2–0 in Belgium and were knocked-out on away goals. In 1998–99, Osijek attained its first trophy, the Croatian Cup, following a victory over Cibalia 2–0. A year later, West Ham United was playing away in Gradski vrt, headed by Frank Lampard, Rio Ferdinand, Trevor Sinclair, Paolo Di Canio, Paulo Wanchope and Igor Štimac.

2000–2015
In the 2000–01 UEFA Cup, NK Osijek beat Brøndby 2–1 (2–1, 0–0) and Rapid Wien 4–1 (2–1, 2–0). In the 3rd round, Osijek beat Slavia Prague 2–0 at home, but lost 5–1 in Prague. Osijek finished third in the league once more. In the 2001–02 UEFA Cup, Osijek progressed past Dinaburg on away goals, beat Gorica in the first round, but then lost 3–5 to AEK Athens. In the 2003–04 HNL, Osijek had the first and second highest goalscorers in the division with Špehar scoring 18 and Goran Ljubojević scoring 16. The club then went through a long phase of mid-table finishes and mediocre results.

NK Osijek was almost relegated during the 2013–14 season. On the final match day, Josip Barišić managed to score and keep Osijek afloat against Hrvatski dragovoljac. Osijek changed coaches on four occasions throughout the season. The following season, Osijek once again finished one position above the relegation play-off spot, finishing one point ahead of Istra 1961.

2015–present
In September 2015, Zoran Zekić was appointed as the first team head coach, replacing Dražen Besek.

With the club facing bankruptcy, Osijek went into private ownership for the first time in its history in February 2016 with Hungarian oligarch Lőrinc Mészáros and Croatian entrepreneur Ivan Meštrović buying a majority of shares in the club. The duo went about stabilizing the club, improving the squad and bringing back ambition to the city and supporters. Much of the debt was restructured and paid off, securing the short-term and long-term future of Osijek.

On 27 February 2017, the club celebrated its 70th anniversary in the Osijek theater. In the 2016–17 season, Osijek finished 4th, which was their highest league finish in nearly 10 years. The 4th place finish led to Osijek participating in the qualifying phase of the 2017–18 UEFA Europa League; with the club staging an extremely successful run to the play-off round, beating Santa Coloma, Luzern and PSV, the former champions of Europe, who won the 1987–88 edition. The club's run was ended following a 1–2 home loss to Austria Wien, and despite the club winning the second leg 1–0, Osijek were eliminated on the away goals rule. Despite being eliminated, Osijek were praised and congratulated by Croatian press, fans and media for their historic run.

In the 2017–18 season, Osijek finished 4th again, securing a place in the UEFA competition. Osijek beat Petrocub Hîncești 2–1 at home after drawing the first leg in Moldova 1–1, and faced Rangers in the second qualifying round of the 2018–19 UEFA Europa League. Osijek lost the home leg 1–0.

After a bad start to the 2020–21 season, during which Osijek managed only a single point after the first three games of the season, manager Ivica Kulešević was sacked. On 5 September 2020, Osijek appointed Nenad Bjelica as the new club manager.

On 9 September 2020, it was announced that Lőrinc Mészáros was no longer the formal co-owner of the club, with the private investment fund BETA taking over his shares in NK OS d.o.o. The reason being that Mészáros was also the owner of Puskás Akadémia FC, and UEFA rules forbade two clubs owned by the same person from participating in European competitions, should they have both qualified.

Stadium

NK Osijek plays its home games at Gradski vrt, where it played its first game on the 7 September 1958, against Sloboda. It was officially opened in 1980.

The current design was made in the year 1979. The upper western tribune is unfinished to this day. The current capacity lies at 18,856 spectator seats, with 980 of them being for standing audiences. Before the club had transferred to Gradski vrt, Osijek played on a pitch next to the river Drava.

In April 2018, NK Osijek president Ivan Meštrović released plans for the new Pampas Stadium. A new state of art stadium will be built at the Pampas neighbourhood in Osijek as part of the new NK Osijek training centre. The capacity of the new stadium will be 12,000, with all of the seats covered. The stadium will be UEFA category four and will be finished in June 2021. During the stadium construction, NK Osijek will play their home games at the current Gradski vrt stadium, which is in the future going to be used as the main stadium for the NK Osijek B squad.

Supporters

The fan club of NK Osijek is called Kohorta (cohort, named after the Roman army unit composed of 360 soldiers). It was founded in 1972 under the name Šokci, and carries the name Kohorta since 1988. Kohorta is usually situated on the eastern tribune of Gradski vrt. Its seat is in the street of the University in Tvrđa, Osijek.

Osijek is the third most supported football club in Croatia with 5% of population supporting it.

Rivalries

The Slavonian derby match is between the two largest Croatian football clubs from eastern Croatia, Osijek and Cibalia. Each new match between these two great rivals, means a great match on the field, but also in the stands.

Osijek–Rijeka derby is the name given to matches between Osijek and HNK Rijeka. On Croatian First Football League all time table Rijeka and Osijek are on the third and fourth place. Rijeka and Osijek are with Dinamo Zagreb and Hajduk Split the only four clubs that have never been relegated from the Croatian First League. Osijek and Rijeka are third and fourth best supported football clubs in Croatia. Osijek is supported by 5% and Rijeka by 4% of population.

Kit manufacturers and sponsors

Honours
Osijek has won one Croatian Cup. In European competitions, the club has reached the third round of the UEFA Cup in 2000–01, the second round of the Intertoto Cup in 2006, the third place of the Mitropa Cup in 1981–82 and play-off round of the UEFA Europa League in 2017–18.

Domestic 
Croatian football league system
Croatian First League
 Runners-up (1): 2020–21

Croatian Cup
 Winner (1): 1998–99
 Runners-up (1): 2011–12

Yugoslav football league system
Yugoslav Second League
 Winner (5): 1952–53, 1969–70, 1972–73, 1976–77, 1980–81

Best results in European competitions

Recent seasons

Key
 League: P = Matches played; W = Matches won; D = Matches drawn; L = Matches lost; F = Goals for; A = Goals against; Pts = Points won; Pos = Final position;
 Cup / Europe: PR = Preliminary round; QR = Qualifying round; R1 = First round; R2 = Second round; QF = Quarter-final; SF = Semi-final; RU = Runner-up; W = Competition won;

European competitions

Summary

Source:, Last updated on 7 September 2022.Pld = Matches played; W = Matches won; D = Matches drawn; L = Matches lost; GF = Goals for; GA = Goals against. Defunct competitions indicated in italics.

By season

Last updated on 28 July 2022.

Player records
Most appearances in UEFA club competitions: 18 appearances
Petar Bočkaj, Mile Škorić
Top scorers in UEFA club competitions: 4 goals
Muzafer Ejupi

Players

Current squad

Out on loan

Personnel

Football school
The football school of NK Osijek was founded in 1982 as the youth school. It was set in motion by Andrija Vekić, with the wish to recruit and create great players and coaches alike by creating a good and competitive atmosphere. Many players considered to be high-level were in that school.

Notable players
To appear in this section a player must have:
 Played at least 150 league games for the club;
 Scored at least 50 league goals for the club; or
 Played at least one international match for their national or olympic team while playing for NK Osijek.
Years in brackets indicate their spells at the club.

 Franjo Rupnik (1947–51)
 Ljupko Petrović (1967–79)
 Ratomir Dujković (1977–80)
 Ivica Miljković (1977–80)
 Mustafa Hukić (1978–81)
 Ivica Grnja (1972–82)
 Jasmin Džeko (1980–84, 1985–89)
 Vlado Kasalo (1983–87)
 Davor Šuker (1984–89)
 Robert Špehar (1988–92, 1994–95, 2002–04)
 Miroslav Bičanić (1989–92, 1994–96)
 Bakir Beširević (1992–94, 1994–02)
 Nenad Bjelica (1992–93, 1999–01)
 Davor Rupnik (1992–98)
 Damir Vuica (1992–94, 1997–02, 2005–08)
 Petar Krpan (1993–98, 2001)
 Mario Galinović (1993–02)
 Ivo Ergović (1994–01)
 Ronald Grnja (1994–04)
 Stjepan Vranješ  (1992–99)
 Ivica Beljan (1994–96, 1997–00)
 Igor Pamić (1995–96)
 Nermin Šabić (1996–97)
 Dumitru Mitu (1996–02)
 Jurica Vranješ (1997–00)
 Josip Balatinac (1997–06)
 Stanko Bubalo (1998–00)
 Mato Neretljak (2000–02)
 Marin Skender (2003–09)
 Valentin Babić (2004–09, 2013–14)
 Ivo Smoje (2005–09, 2010–13)
 Josip Barišić (2005–11, 2013–14)
 Tomislav Šorša (2006–16, 2017–20)
 Domagoj Vida (2006–10)
 Hrvoje Kurtović (2008–16)
 Mile Škorić (2008–11, 2013–)
 Zoran Kvržić (2010–13)
 Antonio Perošević (2010–17)
 Borna Barišić (2013–15, 2016–18)
 Nikola Matas (2014–18)
 Mateo Barać (2016–18)
 Muzafer Ejupi (2016–19)
 Mihail Caimacov (2018–21)
 Mirlind Daku (2018–)
 Ivica Ivušić (2019–)
 Laszlo Kleinheisler (2019–2023)
 Damjan Bohar (2020–2022)
 Mario Jurčević (2020–)

Coaches
incomplete list

  Viktor Šter
  Blagoje Marjanović
  Franjo Glaser
  Bernard Hügl
  Sima Milovanov
  Zorko Hlavač
  Mato Kasač
  Gustav Lechner (1945–49)
  Ernest Dubac (1951–55)
  Milan Antolković (1972–73)
  Miljenko Mihić (1978–79)
  Milan Đuričić (1979)
  Andrija Vekić (1981)
  Josip Duvančić (1982)
  Milan Đuričić (1984–85)
  Ljupko Petrović (1985–87)
  Milan Đuričić (1987)
  Stjepan Čordaš (1989)
  Tonko Vukušić (1990)
  Šaban Jasenica (1990)
  Ivica Grnja (1991)
  Stjepan Čordaš (1992–93)
  Vlado Bilić (1993)
  Ivica Grnja (1993–94)
  Ivo Šušak (1993–95)
  Ivica Matković (1995–96)
  Ante Čačić (1995–96)
  Ivan Katalinić (1995–96)
  Goran Popović (1996–97)
  Luka Bonačić (1996–97)
  Milan Đuričić (1996–99), (2002–03)
  Stanko Poklepović (1998–00), (2002–03)
  Pavo Strugačevac (1999–00)
  Stanko Mršić (1999–01)
  Vlado Bilić (2000–02)
  Vjekoslav Lokica (2001–02)
  Miroslav Blažević (2001–02)
  Nenad Gračan (2002–03)
  Branko Karačić (2003–04)
  Stjepan Čordaš (2004–05)
  Ivo Šušak (July 1, 2005 – Nov 13, 2006)
  Miroslav Žitnjak (2006–07)
  Ilija Lončarević (Nov 14, 2006 – Sept 26, 2008)
  Tomislav Steinbrückner (Sept 26, 2008 – Aug 16, 2010)
  Branko Karačić (Aug 16, 2010 – May 2, 2011)
  Vlado Bilić (May 3, 2011 – March 31, 2012)
  Stanko Mršić (March 31, 2012 – May 13, 2013)
  Miroslav Žitnjak (interim) (May 13, 2013 – June 4, 2013)
  Tomislav Steinbrückner (June 4, 2013 – Aug 18, 2013)
  Davor Rupnik (Aug 19, 2013 – Oct 21, 2013)
  Ivica Kulešević (Oct 21, 2013 – Feb 27, 2014)
  Tomislav Rukavina (Feb 27, 2014 – Feb 11, 2015)
  Ivo Šušak (Feb 11, 2015 – June 1, 2015)
  Dražen Besek (June 14, 2015 – Sept 1, 2015)
  Zoran Zekić (Sept 1, 2015– Mar 29, 2019)
  Dino Skender (Mar 29, 2019 – Sept 21, 2019)
  Ivica Kulešević (Sept 23, 2019 – Sept 4, 2020)
  Nenad Bjelica (Sept 5, 2020 – Aug 29, 2022)

References

External links

 
NK Osijek profile at UEFA.com
NK Osijek profile at Sportnet.hr 
Bijelo-plavi.com unofficial website 
Kohorta.net official supporters' website 

 
Sport in Osijek
Association football clubs established in 1947
Football clubs in Croatia
Football clubs in Osijek-Baranja County
Football clubs in Yugoslavia
1947 establishments in Croatia